A.C. Fiorentina finished in the midfield of Serie A, beating Roma 1-0 in a playoff match due to a goal by ex-Roma player Roberto Pruzzo. The season also marked the international breakthrough of Roberto Baggio, the striker scoring 15 league goals, also setting up several of Stefano Borgonovo's 14.

Squad

Competitions

Serie A

League table

Result by round

Matches

UEFA Cup qualification

Fiorentina qualified for 1989–90 UEFA Cup.

Coppa Italia

First round

Results

Second round

Results

Quarter-finals

Statistics

Players statistics

References

ACF Fiorentina seasons
Fiorentina